Sultopride (trade names Barnetil, Barnotil, Topral) is an atypical antipsychotic of the benzamide chemical class used in Europe, Japan, and Hong Kong for the treatment of schizophrenia. It was launched by Sanofi-Aventis in 1976. Sultopride acts as a selective D2 and D3 receptor antagonist. It has also been shown to have clinically relevant affinity for the GHB receptor as well, a property it shares in common with amisulpride and sulpiride.

Pharmacology

References

Atypical antipsychotics
GHB receptor ligands
Salicylamide ethers
Pyrrolidines
Benzosulfones